The discography of South Korean singer and actress Lee Jung-hyun consists of nine studio albums, two extended plays, and one remix album.

Albums

Studio albums

Remix albums

Extended plays

Singles

Guest appearances

Soundtrack appearances

Music videos

References

External links
 
 

Discographies of South Korean artists